The Deadwood River is a tributary of the Dease River in the far north of British Columbia, Canada.  It forms the southeastern boundary of the Dease Plateau, which extends northward to the Yukon-British Columbia boundary and beyond.

References

Northern Interior of British Columbia
Rivers of British Columbia
Cassiar Land District